The University Center of North Puget Sound is a "center of universities" located in Gray Wolf Hall on Everett Community College's main campus in Everett, WA. The University Center supports over 25 bachelor's and master's degrees from public and private partner universities and colleges to the residents of Snohomish, Island and Skagit Counties. The Center's flexible scheduling (afternoons, evenings and weekends) in combination with varied teaching modalities (on campus, online and hybrid), means that classes are available to fit busy lives.

Each university manages the application, enrollment and degree programs while Washington State University administers the center and provides support services. Graduates receive their diplomas from the institution of their degree program. The diploma is the same as having completed a program on the main campus. 

Degree programs at the University Center of North Puget Sound begin at the Junior & Senior level for Bachelor's degrees.  The degree programs have established pathways that begin where the associate of arts degree ended for seamless transition into major course work and degree attainment. Since moving to Everett Community College's campus in 2009, the University Center has grown to eight partners:
 Central Washington University
 Eastern Washington University
 Hope International University
 Saint Martin's University
 The Evergreen State College
 University of Washington, Bothell
 Washington State University
 Western Washington University

Programs and Degrees
The University Center offers a variety of degrees that complement programs offered by Everett Community College as well as supporting the needs of local business and industry. The major disciplines include: Nursing, Business, Education, Environmental Science, Engineering, Social Sciences and Human and Counseling Services.

Students
The University Center's students range in age from 21 to 63. During the 2010–2011 academic year, the age breakdown was: 

Nearly 45% of the University Center's students have earned credit/degree from Everett Community College prior to enrolling with one of the partner universities.

The University Center of North Puget Sound at a Glance 2010-2011 Student Headcount:
 Total Students - 500
 Female - 75%
 Caucasian - 75%

Student Services
Students enrolled in partner programs at the University Center of North Puget Sound are able to access many of the student services at Everett CC (library, accommodation tables and chairs, technology, e-tutoring, etc.). Additionally, partner universities also provide a variety of services such as writing tutoring, disability services, social events, etc.

Locations
On April 3, 2009, the University Center moved onto Everett Community College's main campus when Gray Wolf Hall opened. The  Gray Wolf Hall is EvCC's first "green" building. It was designed to meet the U.S. Green Building Council's Leadership in Energy and Environmental Design (LEED) Silver Rating. Faculty and staff offices occupy the glass-sided north wing, and classrooms fill the brick-covered south wing. Some of the features include five video conference rooms, two state-of-the-art computer labs, artwork suspended over the second floor bridge, a student lounge and a rain garden in the courtyard.

The third floor of Gray Wolf has a view of the Olympic Mountains. EvCC historically names its buildings after peaks of the Cascade and Olympic mountains.

Gray Wolf Hall was designed by Seattle-based LMN Architects. Construction was by M.A. Mortenson Construction of Seattle. 

The Evergreen State College's Bachelor of Arts in Liberal Arts is offered off-campus on the Tulalip Reservation.

History
The University Center is a product of 1997 state legislation that formed the North Snohomish-Island-Skagit (NSIS) Consortium of higher education institutions to create a flexible and innovative means for expanding higher education opportunities for residents of the three counties. The NSIS Consortium was committed to providing opportunities for place-bound residents whose work and family commitments precluded travel to a distant university. In 2005, the legislature named consortium member Everett Community College as manager of the University Center.  Washington State University now manages the University Center.

Administration
Administrative oversight of the University Center is by Washington State University.

References

Education in Everett, Washington